Pilar Savone (born June 16, 1971) is an American film producer and assistant director. She was nominated for the Academy Award for Best Picture for the 2012 film Django Unchained at the 85th Academy Awards in 2013, along with fellow producers Stacey Sher and Reginald Hudlin.

Filmography

Film

Television

References

External links 

American film producers
Living people
1971 births